Neotelphusa querciella is a moth of the family Gelechiidae. It is found in North America, where it has been recorded from Alabama, Kentucky, Maine, Mississippi, North Carolina and Tennessee.

The forewings are dark iron grey, with a distinct small blackish spot on the costa at about the basal fourth, and two other smaller ones on the costa, one about the middle, and the other at the beginning of the apical cilia. There are three or four similar small ones on the disc. The hindwings are pale slate colour.

The larvae feed on Quercus obtusiloba. They have a whitish body and dark purplish-brown head.

References

Moths described in 1958
Neotelphusa